Radioland is the third studio album by American singer Nicolette Larson. It was produced by Ted Templeman and released by Warner Bros. Records in 1981.

Background
Radioland reached No. 62 on the Billboard 200 and remained on the charts for twelve weeks. Three singles were released from the album during 1981; "Ooo-Eee" in January, "How Can We Go On" in April and "Radioland" in June. All three failed to appear on the Billboard Hot 100. Radioland later received its first release on CD from Wounded Bird Records in 2005.

Critical reception

On its release, Billboard commented that the album "explores the full range of Larson's talent, from hard-rocking numbers like 'Radioland' to a bluesy torch ballad, 'Long Distance Love'". They added, "There are also shades of pretty, sinuous midtempo pop-rock, along the lines of her hit 'Lotta Love'." Cash Box noted Larson's "inspiring vocal versatility" and Templeman's "beautifully thick production". They concluded, "This something-for-everyone LP is suited to a variety of formats." In a retrospective review, Bruce Eder of AllMusic felt the album was a "bold, melodic collection of midtempo country-inspired pop/rock". He added, "Her voice isn't always strong or rich enough to sustain interest in which she's singing, but the diversity of sounds holds the interest."

Track listing

Personnel
 Nicolette Larson - lead vocals (all tracks), backing vocals (tracks 2-8)
 John McFee - guitar (tracks 1-4, 7-8)
 Paul Barrere - guitar (tracks 1-2, 5, 7-8)
 Patrick Simmons - guitar solo (track 1)
 Doug Livingston - electric piano (tracks 1-2, 7-8)
 Billy Payne - synthesizer (tracks 1, 4), keyboards (track 5), synthesizer solo (track 7), organ (track 8), electric piano (track 9)
 Tiran Porter - bass (tracks 1-4, 6-8)
 Keith Knudsen - drums (tracks 1-2, 7-8)
 Ted Templeman - percussion (tracks 1-7), backing vocals (tracks 2, 5-8)
 Bobby LaKind - congas (tracks 1-8)
 Linda Ronstadt - backing vocals (track 2)
 Maureen McDonald - backing vocals (tracks 3-5, 7)
 Rick Shlosser - drums (tracks 3-6, 9)
 Andrew Kastner - guitar (tracks 3-4, 6)
 Mark Jordan - keyboards (tracks 3, 6), synthesizer (track 3), electric piano (track 4), organ (track 9)
 Jerry Jumonville - saxophone (track 5)
 Lee Thornburg - trumpet (track 5)
 Bob Glaub - bass (track 5)
 Gene Meros - saxophone (track 6)
 Fred Tackett - guitar (track 9)
 Klaus Voormann - bass (track 9)

Production
 Ted Templeman - producer
 Jim Isaacson - engineer
 Gene Meros - additional engineer
 Kent Duncan - mastering

Other
 Joan Vallejo - production co-ordinator
 Gribbitt!, Murry Whiteman - design
 Pete Johnson - art direction
 George Holz - photography
 Derek Sutton - management

Charts

References

1981 albums
Nicolette Larson albums
Warner Records albums
Albums produced by Ted Templeman